Line 12, also known as the Golden Line from its color on the system map, is a partially closed rapid transit line of the Mexico City Metro network. It travels  along the boroughs of Benito Juárez, Iztapalapa and Tláhuac in southwestern, central-southern and southeastern Mexico City, serving twenty stations. The line was inaugurated on 30 October 2012, going from Tláhuac to Mixcoac station. In 2016, work to expand it to Observatorio station started.

Line 12 was built by Mexican construction company Empresas ICA in association with Alstom Mexicana and Grupo Carso. It runs at grade, overground and underground levels. The interchange stations are Mixcoac (Line 7), Zapata (Line 3), Ermita (Line 2) and Atlalilco (Line 8), and when completed, Observatorio (Line 1). The line connects with other transport systems in the city, including the trolleybus and the Metrobús systems. In 2019, Line 12 had a total ridership of 134,900,367 passengers, averaging 369,590 passengers per day.

Since its planning, the line underwent several modifications in its layout and characteristics. It was originally planned as a mostly subway line that would operate with rubber-tired trains. Also, the line would not operate primarily along Tláhuac Avenue. However, due to time and budget constraints the project underwent modifications after its announcement, and it became a combined under- and overground line with steel-tired trains running elevated along Tláhuac Avenue. Subsidence was reported on several columns along the elevated section before testings with trains started. From the onset of service, problems on the line were still reported especially on the elevated part of the line. In early 2014, operations were halted on that section and they were resumed until late 2015. The elevated track later suffered the impact of a  earthquake in September 2017. In May 2021, a portion of the line's overpass collapsed while a train was on it. 26 people were killed and line operations had to be suspended. Preliminary investigations have suggested that the bridge had a deficient and questionable construction. On January 15, 2023, the section from Mixcoac to Atlalilco reopened for service.

History

Origins

In the 1980s, the Comisión de Vialidad y Transporte Urbano (COVITUR), an organization of the Federal District Department, presented a plan for the Mexico City Metro based on several studies and reports related to the rapid growth of the city and its demand for public transportation. On the 1985 Metro Master Plan (Spanish: Programa Maestro del Metro de 1985), COVITUR considered a metro line that would run on the southern part of Mexico City from west to east and it designated as Line 12. It would run from Santa Lucía, in Álvaro Obregón, to Canal de Garay, in Iztapalapa (near Constitución de 1917 station).

In 1996, the Sistema de Transporte Colectivo (STC), the organization responsible for the metro, published its plan for the next 25 years, the 1995 Metro and Light Rail Master Plan (Spanish: Plan Maestro del Metro y Trenes Ligero). The document considered the new demand for public transport as well as the urban expansion towards the suburbs and the neighboring State of Mexico. Line 12 appeared again in the plan, with some changes, but the route was almost the same. The 1996 Line 12 project would start in Santa Lucía and it would end at a station called Francisco del Paso (otherwise known as Del Paso or Axomulco) in Iztacalco. The idea was that both Line 8 and Line 12 would share Francisco del Paso station as a transfer station; then, the stretch of Line 8 going from this new station (and the stations between Atlalilco and Constitución de 1917) would be transferred to Line 12, while Line 8 would have a new expansion from Francisco del Paso towards Acoxpa, in Tlalpan.

Announcement
In December 2006, the government of Mexico City announced the possible construction of a new metro line to satisfy the demand for public transportation in the south of the city, taking into consideration Line 12's original plans. In July 2007, the city announced a query among its citizens, named Consulta Verde, to choose between two routes. The line would go from Mixcoac to Iztapalapa; from there, there were two choices: Iztapalapa–Acoxpa or Iztapalapa–Tláhuac. The winning route became Iztapalapa–Tláhuac. Tláhuac, one of the easternmost Mexico City boroughs, did not have metro service by then. For the project, some of the stations for Line 11 were merged into Line 12 (from Culhuacán to Periférico Oriente—with almost all the names of the stations changed).

On 8 August 2007 the project was officially presented as "Línea 12: línea dorada, la línea del Bicentenario" (Line 12: Golden Line, the Bicentennial Line) and, thus, its chosen distinctive color was golden. The project was assigned to Proyecto Metro, which was headed by Enrique Horcasitas. The announced stations from west to east, with their original names, were: Mixcoac, Insurgentes Sur, 20 de Noviembre (later renamed to Hospital 20 de Noviembre), Zapata, Parque de los Venados, 
Eje Central (otherwise known as Popocatépetl), Ermita, Sur 69, Vía Láctea, Mexicaltzingo, Francisco del Paso, Ganaderos (otherwise known as Granaderos), Canal Nacional, ESIME Culhuacán, La Vírgen, Calle 11, Periférico Oriente, Tezonco (also known as San Lorenzo), Olivos (also known as Los Olivos), Francisco Villa (later renamed to Nopalera), Zapotitlán, Tlaltenco and Tláhuac. All but the last three were planned as underground stations.

Construction

Due to budget, time, and other setbacks, the line underwent several modifications. For instance, Sur 69 and Vía Láctea stations were not built due to neighborhood opposition. Ganaderos station was rejected by the National Institute of Anthropology and History because its construction would have affected a nearby archaeological site. Francisco del Paso station was canceled because its construction would have caused a six-month partial closure of Line 8; instead Atlalilco station was chosen as the interchange station and as a consequence it has the longest passenger transfer tunnel in the system. These issues caused the route to be changed. Instead of running along Arneses Avenue (Eje 3 Oriente) and later along Canal Nacional Avenue, the route was moved instead to run along Tláhuac Avenue (Ejes 9 and 10 Sur). ESIME Culhuacán and La Vírgen stations were relocated and became San Andrés Tomatlán and Lomas Estrella stations, respectively. Between Atlalilco and San Andrés Tomatlán, Culhuacán station was added to the route.

Construction of the first leg of the line, Tláhuac–Atlalilco, started on 23 September 2008. The section was replanned as an at-grade route to be later modified to a combined at-grade and elevated section. The second stretch of the line, which runs underground from Atlalilco to Mixcoac, was finished in April 2012. The line was built by a consortium comprised by ICA Group, Carso and Alstom.

The project suffered multiple construction delays, and its $1.3 billion cost was a 50% overrun.

Inauguration
Starting on 16 June 2012, the STC allowed riders to have access on Sundays to test the service and to familiarize them with the stations and route. The line began daily service on Monday 24 September 2012, and it was officially inaugurated on 30 October 2012 by Marcelo Ebrard, Head of Government of the Federal District from 2006 to 2012 and Felipe Calderón, President of Mexico from 2006 to 2012.

Temporary partial closure
In an unprecedented event in the history of Mexico City Metro, Line 12 had to be shut down temporarily in the stretch Tláhuac–Atlalilco due to severe faults in its infrastructure. This section is the one that corresponds to the elevated stretch of the line.

The technical and structural faults of the elevated stretch caused the trains to run on the verge of derailment, due to wear on the rails that provoked slopes and damage to the tires of the trains, putting six out of the 30 trains out of service.

The stretch was closed between 12 March 2014 and 29 November 2015, when the section going from Tezonco to Tláhuac was officially reopened by Miguel Ángel Mancera, Head of Government of the Federal District from 2012 to 2018. Previously, on October 27, 2015, the stretch Periférico Oriente–Culhuacán, resumed the service, but all trains stopped at Periférico Oriente station till the service on the whole line was reestablished.

2017 earthquake

On 19 September 2017, a 7.1 magnitude earthquake hit Mexico City and other zones of Central Mexico, affecting Line 12 with electrical power shortages and the derailing of a train between the Nopalera and Zapotitlán stations. Due to this, and potential damages to the line's infrastructure, service in the Tláhuac–Culhuacán section of the line was suspended.

After evaluations, it was determined that the line had visible damages in the tracks and structural faults. Therefore, the stretch from Olivos to Tláhuac was closed for repairs. Service in all the closed stations was resumed on 30 October 2017.

Expansion

In 2017, an expansion for Line 12 was announced. Construction started on 29 November 2017. The extension was expected to be completed by 2020, but works were delayed, thus, being projected to open by 2021.

The two new stations are Valentín Campa and Álvaro Obregón, both situated in the Álvaro Obregón borough. The totality of the extension is being constructed underground and is expected to open in December 2023.

The original 1985 and 1996 plans for Line 12 considered the line going westward from Mixcoac with two new stations, as in the undergoing expansion. Nevertheless, the connection with Line 1 at Observatorio was not planned in the projects.

2021 overpass collapse

On 3 May 2021, a section of an overpass collapsed at the Olivos station, resulting in 26 deaths and 79 injuries.

Route
Mixcoac station, the provisional western terminus of the line, lies along Extremadura Avenue (Eje 7 Sur), in the neighborhood of the same name. The line heads eastward along the avenue to Insurgentes Sur station at the intersection with Insurgentes Sur Avenue. Eje 7 Sur changes its name to Félix Cuevas Avenue and the track continues to Hospital 20 de Noviembre (next to the hospital of the same name). As the line reaches Zapata station, the avenue changes its name to General Emiliano Zapata Avenue, and continues to Parque de los Venados station (next to the public park of the same name). As the line reaches División del Norte Avenue, the line turns and runs along it. Then, when the route gets to Popocatépetl Avenue (Eje 8 Sur), it turns again and arrives at Eje Central station, located below the avenue of the same name. As the line arrives at Ermita station, the avenue changes its name to Calzada Ermita Iztapalapa. It passes Mexicaltzingo station and later arrives at Atlalilco station.

The line continues until the intersection with Tláhuac Avenue (Eje 9 Sur and later Eje 10 Sur) and the track emerges to the surface to become an elevated railway. It continues along the avenue to Culhuacán, San Andrés Tomatlán, Lomas Estrella, Calle 11, Periférico Oriente, Tezonco, Olivos, Nopalera and Zapotitlán stations. When Tláhuac Avenue reaches Canal del Acalote Avenue, the track turns and descends to the street level. It arrives at Tlaltenco station, and later to the southeastern terminal of Tláhuac, along San Rafael Atlixco Avenue.

Rolling stock

The FE-10 model, by Construcciones y Auxiliar de Ferrocarriles (CAF), is a steel-wheeled train model exclusively used on Line 12. As of May 2021, 30 trains are operating in the line. The trains were built by CAF in Spain.

Station list 

The stations from west to east: 
{| class="wikitable" rules="all"
|-
!rowspan="2" | No.
!rowspan="2" | Station
!rowspan="2" | Date opened
!rowspan="2" | Level
!colspan="2" | Distance (km)
!rowspan="2" | Connection
!Pictogram
!rowspan="2" | Location
|-
!style="font-size: 65%;"|Betweenstations
!style="font-size: 65%;"|Total
!Description
|-
|style="background: #; color: white;"|01
|Mixcoac
| rowspan="20" |October 30, 2012
| rowspan="7" |Underground,deep trench
|style="text-align:right;"|-
|style="text-align:right;"|0.0
|
  Line 7
 Mixcoac

 Routes: 1-D, 13-A, 115-A, 116, 119-B, 124, 124-A, 200 (also temporary Line 12 service)
  Line 3: Mixcoac Norte stop, Mixcoac Sur stop
|The station is named after the neighborhood of Mixcoac, where it is located. The station pictogram depicts a snake because the Nahuatl name Mixcoac means "Nest of Cloud Serpents".
|rowspan="7"|Benito Juárez
|-
|style="background: #; color: white;"|02
|Insurgentes Sur
|style="text-align:right;"|0.8
|style="text-align:right;"|0.8
|

  Line 1: Félix Cuevas station (at distance)
 Insurgentes Sur stop (temporary Line 12 service)
  Line 3: Insurgentes Sur stop
 Route: 6-A (at distance)
|The icon for the station depicts Miguel Hidalgo and José Morelos, two of the main rebel leaders during the Mexican War of Independence.
|-
|style="background: #; color: white;"|03
|Hospital 20 de Noviembre
|style="text-align:right;"|0.9
|style="text-align:right;"|1.7
|

 Hospital 20 de Noviembre stop (temporary Line 12 service)
  Line 3: Hospital 20 de Noviembre stop
 Route: 6-A (at distance)
|The name of the station originates from the nearby hospital, and the station's icon depicts the hospital's distinctive roof structure. The Hospital 20 de Noviembre serves Colonia Del Valle Sur neighborhood.
|-
|style="background: #; color: white;"|04
|Zapata
|style="text-align:right;"|0.6
|style="text-align:right;"|2.3
|
  Line 3
 Zapata

  Line 3: Pueblo Santa Cruz Atoyac station (at distance)
 Routes: 1-D, 52-C, 120, 121-A (also temporary Line 12 service)
  Line 3: Zapata 1 stop, Zapata 2 stop
 Route: 6-A
|The station logo depicts Emiliano Zapata, a national hero from the Mexican Revolution of 1910–1921.
|-
|style="background: #; color: white;"|05
|Parque de los Venados
|style="text-align:right;"|0.7
|style="text-align:right;"|3.0
|

  Line 3: Parque de los Venados stop
 Route: 6-A
|The station's name originates from a nearby park, commonly known as Parque de los Venados (Park of the Deer) on account of the deer statues located there. The station's pictogram depicts two deers, representing the aforementioned statues located at the adjacent park.
|-
|style="background: #; color: white;"|06
|Eje Central
|style="text-align:right;"|1.4
|style="text-align:right;"|4.4
|
 Route: 52-C (also temporary Line 12 service)
  Line 1: Popocatépetl stop
 Route: 6-A
|The station receives its name due to being located at the intersection between Eje Central (Lázaro Cardenas) and Avenida Popocatépetl. The station's pictogram shows the outline of a Mexico City trolleybus.
|-
|style="background: #; color: white;"|07
|Ermita
|style="text-align:right;"|1.0
|style="text-align:right;"|5.4
|
  Line 2
 Routes: 2-A, 31-B, 52-C, 111-A, 145-A (also temporary Line 12 service)
 Routes: 6-A (at distance), 17-C, 17-H, 17-I
|The station logo depicts a chapel: the Spanish word ermita means a small chapel constructed outside a church. The name of this station refers to San Cosme ermita, constructed in 1526.
|-
|style="background: #; color: white;"|08
|Mexicaltzingo
| rowspan="2" |Underground,trench
|style="text-align:right;"|2.0
|style="text-align:right;"|7.4
|
 Routes: 1-D, 37, 52-C (also temporary Line 12 service)
 Routes: 5-A, 6-A
|The name of the station is taken from that of the colonia it is located in. The station's icon depicts the god Mexictli sitting on top of an inverted maguey plant, in reference to Mexicaltzingo's symbol in the Codex of Coatlinchan.
|rowspan="6"|Iztapalapa
|-
|style="background: #; color: white;"|09
|Atlalilco
|style="text-align:right;"|2.1
|style="text-align:right;"|9.5
|
  Line 8
 Temporary Line 12 service: Atlalilco stop
 Routes: 1-D, 52-C (also temporary Line 12 service)
<li> Route: 6-A
|The station's logo is a well of water. Atlalilco in Nahuatl means: "where water is kept".
|-
|style="background: #; color: white;"|10
|Culhuacán
| rowspan="9" |Elevated
|style="text-align:right;"|1.8
|style="text-align:right;"|11.3
|
<li> Culhuacán stop (temporary Line 12 service)
<li>  Line 7: Culhuacán stop (also temporary Line 12 service)
|The station is named after the pueblo of Culhuacán, which was an important prehispanic city and is now a designated "Barrio Mágico" within the borough of Iztapalapa. The station's icon depicts the Aztec glyph for Culhuacán.
|-
|style="background: #; color: white;"|11
|San Andrés Tomatlán
|style="text-align:right;"|1.1
|style="text-align:right;"|12.4
|
<li> Temporary Line 12 service: San Andrés Tomatlán stop
<li> San Andrés Tomatlán stop (temporary Line 12 service)
<li>  Line 7: San Andrés Tomatlán stop (also temporary Line 12 service)
|The station is named after the neighborhood of San Andrés Tomatlán and the icon depicts the local church of San Andrés Apostol located just to the west of the station.
|-
|style="background: #; color: white;"|12
|Lomas Estrella
|style="text-align:right;"|1.2
|style="text-align:right;"|13.6
|
<li> Lomas Estrella stop (temporary Line 12 service)
<li>  Line 7: Lomas Estrella stop (also temporary Line 12 service)
|The name is received from the neighborhoods surrounding the location of the Station: Lomas Estrella 1st and 2nd Section. The station logo represents the back of Cerro de la Estrella and a star above it.
|-
|style="background: #; color: white;"|13
|Calle 11
|style="text-align:right;"|1.1
|style="text-align:right;"|14.7
|
<li> Calle 11 stop (temporary Line 12 service)
<li> Temporary Line 12 service: Calle 11 stop
|Its name is due to its proximity to Calle or Avenida 11. The station's logo represents the glyph of a vessel with water.
|-
|style="background: #; color: white;"|14
|Periférico Oriente
|style="text-align:right;"|1.3
|style="text-align:right;"|16.0
|
<li> Periférico Oriente
<li> Temporary Line 12 service: Periférico Oriente stop
<li> Routes: 47-A, 57-A, 57-C, 162 (also temporary Line 12 service)
<li> Temporary Line 12 service: Periférico Oriente stop
|The symbol for the station depicts the outline of a prison guard tower, in reference to the nearby Recusorio Oriente prison.
|rowspan=7| Tláhuac
|-
|style="background: #; color: white;"|15
|Tezonco
|style="text-align:right;"|1.7
|style="text-align:right;"|17.7
|
<li> Temporary Line 12 service: Tezonco stop
<li> Route: 162 (also temporary Line 12 service)
<li> Temporary Line 12 service: Tezonco stop
|The station's pictogram features a calavera as it references the area's Day of the Dead traditions during the festivity.
|-
|style="background: #; color: white;"|16
|Olivos
|style="text-align:right;"|0.6
|style="text-align:right;"|18.3
|
<li> Route: 162 (also temporary Line 12 service)
<li> Temporary Line 12 service: Olivos stop
|The station's pictogram features an olive branch, as it references the area's reputation for olive oil production during the Colonial period.
|-
|style="background: #; color: white;"|17
|Nopalera
|style="text-align:right;"|1.5
|style="text-align:right;"|19.8
|
<li> Temporary Line 12 service: Nopalera stop
<li> Route: 162 (also temporary Line 12 service)
<li> Temporary Line 12 service: Nopalera stop
|The name of the station alludes to the numerous pig and poultry farms that used to occupy the area, and to the nopal cactuses that used to grow on their fields. Similarly, the icon for the station depicts the outline of a flowering nopal.
|-
|style="background: #; color: white;"|18
|Zapotitlán
|style="text-align:right;"|1.5
|style="text-align:right;"|21.3
|
<li> Temporary Line 12 service: Zapotitlán stop
<li> Routes: 162, 162-D (also temporary Line 12 service)
<li> Temporary Line 12 service: Zapotitlán stop
|The name is due to the fact that the station is located near the town of Santiago Zapotitlan. The word is composed as Tzapotl, an abbreviation of Cuatzapotl (sapote tree) and Titlán which means Between sapote trees. The current logo represents a tree that shows the sapotes in its three branches, and in the trunk some Tlantli teeth that represent the ending "tlan".
|-
|style="background: #; color: white;"|19
|Tlaltenco
| rowspan="2" |At grade
|style="text-align:right;"|1.3
|style="text-align:right;"|22.6
|
<li> Tlaltenco stop (temporary Line 12 service)
<li> Temporary Line 12 service: Tlaltenco stop
|Tlaltenco station serves the San Francisco Tlaltenco town, from which it receives its name. The station's pictogram features a stone gateway known as "La Puerta" (lit. transl. "the Gateway").
|-
|style="background: #; color: white;"|20
|Tláhuac
|style="text-align:right;"|1.5
|style="text-align:right;"|24.1
|
<li> Tláhuac
<li> Temporary Line 12 service: Tláhuac stop
<li> Routes: 141, 148, 149 (also temporary Line 12 service)
<li> Temporary Line 12 service: Tláhuac stop
|The station's pictogram features the glyph of Tláhuac. Symbol that represents said mayor's office.
|}

Extension
A possible extension of the line to connect it with Line 1 at Observatorio station was announced in February 2013, thus making Observatorio the new west terminus of the line. The project was approved in September 2013 by Gerardo Ruiz Esparza, Secretary of Communications and Transportation.

Construction started on 29 November 2017. The extension was expected to be completed by 2020, but works were delayed, thus, being projected to open by 2021. In September 2020, it was announced that works on Line 12 will be finished by the end of 2022 and that service will begin in 2023.

The stretch will have three underground stations: Álvaro Obregón, Valentín Campa and Observatorio, in the Álvaro Obregón borough.

Ridership
According to the data provided by the authorities, the line registered 134,900,367 entrances, averaging 369,590 commuters per day in 2019. Tláhuac is the busiest station on the line—and one of the busiest of the system—averaging 56,831 entrances that year; in contrast Tlaltenco station averaged fewer than 5,000 passengers per year and consistently ranks among the least used on the Metro network.

See also 
 List of Mexico City Metro lines

Notes

References

External links 
 

2012 establishments in Mexico
Railway lines opened in 2012
12